is a 1952 Japanese drama film directed by Noboru Nakamura based on the novel by Yūzō Yamamoto. It was entered into the 1952 Cannes Film Festival.

Cast
 Chikage Awashima
 Akira Ishihama
 Hanshiro Iwai
 Yōko Katsuragi
 Chishū Ryū
 Shin Saburi
 Takeshi Sakamoto
 Keiko Tsushima

References

External links

1952 films
1952 drama films
Japanese black-and-white films
Japanese drama films
Films based on Japanese novels
Films directed by Noboru Nakamura
1950s Japanese films